Pinto Barros (born 4 May 1973) is a Mozambican former footballer who played as a defender. He made 44 appearances for the Mozambique national team from 1994 to 1999. He was also named in Mozambique's squad for the 1998 African Cup of Nations tournament.

Career
Barros played for Ferroviário Maputo and South African club AmaZulu.

References

External links
 

1973 births
Living people
Mozambican footballers
Association football defenders
Mozambique international footballers
1996 African Cup of Nations players
1998 African Cup of Nations players
Moçambola players
Clube Ferroviário de Maputo footballers
Mozambican expatriate footballers
Mozambican expatriate sportspeople in South Africa
Expatriate soccer players in South Africa
Place of birth missing (living people)